The 2018–19 Valencia CF season was the club's 99th in its history and 84th in La Liga. Valencia qualified for the UEFA Champions League for the first time since 2015–16, entering and being eliminated at the group stage. Valencia competed at the UEFA Europa League, entering at the round of 32 and eliminated at the semi-finals.
Valencia competed and won the Copa del Rey achieving its 8th title overall, and the first since 2008 after entering at the round of 32.

Current squad

Out on loan

Transfers

In

 Total Spending: €126,200,000

Out

 Total Income: €62,900,000**

Net Income:  €63,300,000

**Valencia originally received €5,000,000 for Maksimović on 16 July 2018, with the club retaining a buy-back option for 3 years. At the end of the season, Getafe paid Valencia an additional €5,000,000 to retain the player, with Valencia rescinding their buy-back rights and instead receiving 30% of any future transfer.

Club

Kits
Supplier: Adidas / Sponsor: BLU Products

Kit information
Adidas supplied their last kit for Valencia this season, which saw an end to 5 years of contract. Puma became the club's new kit supplier starting in July 2019.

Competitions

Overall

La Liga

Valencia made a very poor start to the season with five draws and a loss in their first six matches, leaving them perilously close to the relegation places. After beating Real Sociedad, they were winless again for a further four games before beating Getafe, and at the mid-point of the season they had only amassed 23 points. Thereafter, they made a remarkable comeback, going 12 consecutive matches undefeated to put themselves in contention for a place in the Champions League. They clinched fourth place with a victory over Real Valladolid on the last day of the season.

League table

Results summary

Result round by round

Matches

Copa del Rey

Round of 32

Round of 16

Quarter-finals

Semi-finals

Final

UEFA Champions League

Group stage

UEFA Europa League

Knockout phase

Round of 32

Round of 16

Quarter-finals

Semi-finals

Statistics

Appearances and goals
Last updated on 25 May 2019

|-
! colspan=14 style=background:#dcdcdc; text-align:center|Goalkeepers

|-
! colspan=14 style=background:#dcdcdc; text-align:center|Defenders

|-
! colspan=14 style=background:#dcdcdc; text-align:center|Midfielders

|-
! colspan=14 style=background:#dcdcdc; text-align:center|Forwards

|-
! colspan=14 style=background:#dcdcdc; text-align:center| Players who have made an appearance or had a squad number this season but have been loaned out or transferred
|-

|-
|}

References

External links
Club's official website

Valencia
Valencia CF seasons
Valencia